Kista may refer to:

 Kista, a district in Stockholm, Sweden
 Kista borough, a borough in Stockholm, Sweden
 Kista metro station in Stockholm, Sweden
 Kista Galleria, a shopping mall in Stockholm, Sweden
 Kista Science Tower, a skyscraper in Stockholm, Sweden
 Kista Torn, a pair of apartment buildings in Stockholm, Sweden
 Kista Nunatak in Antarctica
 Kista Rock, an island off the Antarctic coast
 Kista Strait, a strait in Mac. Robertson Land, Antarctica